Medi Sadoun (born 8 July 1973) is a French actor born in Paris. He is known for playing the role of Rachid Benassem in Serial (Bad) Weddings.

Filmography

Feature films

Television

References

External links

 
 Allociné

1973 births
Living people
21st-century French male actors
French male film actors
French male television actors
French male voice actors
Male actors from Paris
French people of Italian descent
French people of Algerian descent